Satellu (also Romanized as Sātellū and Sāţellū; also known as Salţū, Satil, Sātloo, Sātlū, and Satyn) is a village in Tazeh Kand Rural District, Khosrowshahr District, Tabriz County, East Azerbaijan Province, Iran. At the 2006 census, its population was 1,365, in 247 families.

References 

Populated places in Tabriz County